Natnicha Cherdchubuppakaree ( 16 November 1997 – 7 April 2018), nicknamed Inn, was a Thai actress.

Discography

Television dramas
 (2003) kaewtawaanjai ch7 
 (2003) pornprom onlaweng ch7
 (2004) rakkernpikadkean ch7
 (2005) panndinhuajai ch3
 (2005) kaewrelm

 2003 Kaew Ta Warn Jai (แก้วตาหวานใจ) (/Ch.7) as Alin Warodom (Modtanoy) (อลิน วโรดม (มดตะนอย))  
 2003 Pon Prom Onlaweng (2003) (พรพรหมอลเวง) (/Ch.7) as Kattaleeya (Kat) (แคทรียา (แคท)) 
 2003  (นายร้อยสอยดาว) (/Ch.7) as Meen (มีน) 
 2003 Mur Puen Por Luk Kit (2003) (มือปืนพ่อลูกติด) (Lenitas/Ch.7) as Hanny (Cameo) (ฮันนี่ (รับเชิญ)) 
 2003 Kularb Len Fai (กุหลาบเล่นไฟ) (/Ch.7) as Dao (chird) (ดาว (วัยเด็ก)) 
 2004 Ruk Kern Pikad Kaen (2004) (รักเกินพิกัดแค้น) (Polyplus Entertainment/Ch.7) as (chird) (Cameo) (นิษฐา (วัยเด็ก) (รับเชิญ))
 2004 Ruen Mai See Beige (เรือนไม้สีเบจ) (TV Scene & Picture/Ch.3) as Nok Gaew (Cameo) (นกแก้ว (รับเชิญ))
 2005  (ขบวนการปุกปุย) (/Ch.7) as Pub (ปั๊บ) 
 2005  (8-18-28 บ้านแฝดยกกำลัง 2) (TV Thunder/Ch.3) as Kung King (กุ๊งกิ๊ง) 
 2005 Pan Din Hua Jai (แผ่นดินหัวใจ) (Broadcast Thai Television/Ch.3) as Ma Prang (มะปราง) 
 2005 Barb Rak Talay Fun (บาปรักทะเลฝัน) (Quiz and Quest/Ch.3) as Aumakorn (Aum) (chird) (Cameo) (อุมากร (อุ๋ม) (วัยเด็ก) (รับเชิญ)) 
 2005 Keaw Lerm Korn (2005) (แก้วลืมคอน) (Exact-Scenario/Ch.5) as Kaew/Chidchanok (chird) (Cameo) (แก้ว/ชิดชนก (วัยเด็ก) (รับเชิญ)) 
 2005 Ruk Kong Nai Dok Mai (รักของนายดอกไม้) (Red Drama/Ch.3) as Bow Chompoo (โบว์ชมพู) 
 2005  (นกออก) (/Ch.7) as Lee Na (ลีน่า) 
 2005 Pa Yak Rai Hau Jai Jew (พยัคฆ์ร้ายหัวใจจิ๋ว) (/Ch.7) as Salim (ซ่าหริ่ม) 
 2006  (โรบอทน้อยหัวใจเพชร) (/ITV) as () 
 2006 Plaew Fai Nai Fhun (2006) (เปลวไฟในฝัน) (/Ch.7) as Mee Na (มีนา) 
 2006  (สุดรักสุดดวงใจ) (/Ch.3) as Ploypim (chird) (Cameo) (พลอยพิมพ์ (วัยเด็ก) (รับเชิญ)) 
 2006 Tay Jai Rak Nak Wang Pan (เทใจรักนักวางแผน) (Five Fingers Productions/Ch.3) as Lin (Cameo) (หลิน (รับเชิญ)) 
 2006 Poh Krua Hua Pah (2006) (พ่อครัวหัวป่าก์) (/ITV) as Thong Tra (chird) (Cameo) (ทองตรา (วัยเด็ก) (รับเชิญ)) 
 2006 Yuer Marn (เหยื่อมาร) (Who & Who/Ch.3) as Nu Daeng (Cameo) (หนูแดง (รับเชิญ)) 
 2007 Saeng Soon (2007) (แสงสูรย์) (Exact-Scenario/Ch.5) as Chothirut (chird) (Cameo) (โชติรส (วัยเด็ก) (รับเชิญ))
 2008 Ruk Sorn Kaen (รักซ่อนแค้น) (Polyplus Entertainment/Ch.3) as (น้ำเหนือ (วัยเด็ก))
 2015 The Kiss of Justice (จุมพิตพยัคฆ์สาว) (Kantana Group/Ch.7) as Pang (ฟาง)
 2018 Sen Son Kon Rak (เส้นสนกลรัก) (Cholumpi Brother/Ch.3) as Noina (น้อยหน่า)

Television series
 2018 Bangkok Ghost Stories: (Bangkok Ghost Stories ตอน ดีเจคลื่นแทรก) (/Ch.3) as Fah (ฟ้า)

Television sitcom

Film
 20  (อ) as 

Song
 2007 Album น้องอินมาค่ะ VOL.1 (Sony Music)  
 2007 Album น้องอินมาค่ะ VOL.2 (Sony Music)  
 2008 Album Just Kid In (Sony Music)

Music video appearance
 20  -  (C/YouTube:) 
 20  -  (C/YouTube:)

References 
ณัฐนิชา เชิดชูบุพการี

1997 births
2018 deaths
Natnicha Cherdchubuppakaree
Natnicha Cherdchubuppakaree
Natnicha Cherdchubuppakaree
Natnicha Cherdchubuppakaree
Natnicha Cherdchubuppakaree
Natnicha Cherdchubuppakaree
Natnicha Cherdchubuppakaree
Natnicha Cherdchubuppakaree
Natnicha Cherdchubuppakaree
Natnicha Cherdchubuppakaree
Natnicha Cherdchubuppakaree
Natnicha Cherdchubuppakaree
Natnicha Cherdchubuppakaree
Natnicha Cherdchubuppakaree